. Seventh son of Itakura Katsuzumi. Fourth Itakura daimyō of Bitchū-Matsuyama Domain succeeded by Itakura Katsuaki).

Family
 Father: Itakura Katsuzumi
 Mother: Uehara clan's daughter
 Wife: Toda Ujihide's daughter
 Concubines:
 Shindo Clan's daughter
 Tanimura Clan's daughter
 Honta clan's daughter
 Children:
 Itakura Katsuaki by Toda Ujihide's daughter
 Itakura Katsunao (1785-1820) by Honta clan's daughter
 Itakura Katsutaka
 daughter married Iwaki Takanobu
 daughter married Yanagisawa Satoyo

Title

Daimyo
1759 births
1821 deaths
Itakura clan